The National Bank of Greece (NBG) is a global banking and financial services company with its headquarters in Athens, Greece. It is the largest Greek bank by total assets.

85% of the company's pretax preprovision profits are derived from its operations in Greece, complemented by 15% from Southeastern Europe. The group offers financial products and services for corporate and institutional clients along with private and business customers. Services include banking services, brokerage, insurance, asset management, shipping finance, leasing and factoring markets. The group is the largest Greek bank by total assets and the third largest by market capitalisation of €1.06 billion as at 4 December 2018. It is the second largest by deposits in Greece after Piraeus Bank. It is fourth largest by Greek loan assets trailing Piraeus Bank, Alpha Bank and Eurobank Ergasias.

The bankers Jean-Gabriel Eynard and Georgios Stavros founded NBG in 1841 as a commercial bank. Stavros was also elected as the first director of the Bank until his death in 1869. From NBG's inception until the establishment of the Bank of Greece in 1928, NBG enjoyed the right to issue banknotes. When the Athens Stock Exchange was founded in 1880, NBG immediately listed on the exchange, a listing it has retained to the present.

The bank is currently listed on the Athens Exchange (ISIN GRS003003019); it is a constituent of the FTSE/Athex Large Cap index. From 1999 to 2015 it was listed on the New York Stock Exchange (NYSE:NBG, ADR, ISIN US6336437057).

History

NBG was founded in 1841 in Athens, by the decree "On the establishment of (a) National Bank" (Official Gazette, no. 6 of March 30, 1841, p.59), according to which the National Bank is a private limited company based in Athens with a capital of 5,000,000 drachmas, divided into 5,000 shares of 1,000 drachmas. It was the first bank in the Modern Greek state’s history.

At its founding the major shareholder of the National Bank was the Greek state with 1,000 shares out of 3,402. Other major shareholders were Nicholas Zosimas with 500 shares, Jean-Gabriel Eynard with 300 shares, King Louis of Bavaria with 200 shares, Konstantinos Vranis with 150 shares, Adolf Graf with 146 shares and Theodoros Rallis with 100 shares. Rothshild Frères Paris bought 50 shares and Jean-Gabriel Eynard bought another 50 shares in their name to boost the prestige of the new bank. It used to have the sole right of note issue, which it lost in 1928 when the newly established Bank of Greece took over as the country's central bank.  In 1880, NBG was listed in the Athenas Stock Exchange. In 1899, NBG acquired the Privileged Bank of Epirus and Thessaly (Pronomiouchos Trapeza Epirothessalias).

The arrival of the 20th Century saw NBG begin its international expansion. In 1904 NBG established Banque d’Orient, together with Nationalbank für Deutschland, which almost immediately withdrew from the venture. The Greeks kept the branches in Thessaloniki (Selanik), Smyrna (İzmir), which were part of the Ottoman Empire at the time, and Alexandria, Egypt. Three years later, NBG chose Cyprus as another location. NBG became government-owned during the First World War when NBG refused to finance new military equipment for the Greek government. The government then passed a law that permitted the government to appoint its own people to the Bank's board.

In 1919 NBG acquired the Bank of Crete (Trapeza Kritis). However, in 1923 the Treaty of Lausanne provided for a compulsory exchange of populations between Greece and Turkey, leading to the departure of the Greeks from Smyrna. As a result, Banque d’Orient closed its branch there. The influx of more than 1 million refugees to Greece during this period created several challenges; NBG played a pivotal role in their settlement with loans and related instruments. 

The 1930s saw further international expansion. In 1930 NBG and Bank of Athens combined their activities in Egypt into a joint subsidiary, Banque Nationale de Grèce et d’Athènes. Two years later, NBG acquired Banque d'Orient (Trapeza Anatolis). Then in 1939, on the eve of the Second World War, the NBG established a subsidiary in New York City, the Hellenic Bank Trust Company. In World War II, the NBG in Greece was managed by Deutsche Bank for the German Occupiers.

Post WWII

In 1953 the NBG took over the Bank of Athens, which was at that time the second largest Bank in Greece. Both banks cooperated before in their foreign branches in Middle East which were operated as Banque Nationale de Grèce et d’Athènes. The NBG took over also the affiliated South African Bank of Athens (est. 1947). The former headquarters of the Bank of Athens are also still used until today. In 1960 Egypt nationalised all banks in Egypt, including Banque Nationale de Grèce et d’Athènes, which it merged into National Bank of Egypt.

In 1965 NBG acquired the Greek Trapeza Epagelmatikis Pistis (Professional Credit Bank). The next year bank governor Georgios Mavros founded the National Bank of Greece Cultural Foundation. In 1978 the Greek government permitted the formation of Arab Hellenic Bank with 49% Arab ownership, as an exception to its prohibition on foreign banks owning more than 40% of the equity of a Greek bank. NBG held 51% and provided most of the bank staff. The Libyan Arab-Foreign Bank and Kuwaiti Investment Organisation held 40% between them while other Arab investors held 9%. That same year NBG opened again a branch in Cairo. In 1994 NBG incorporated its branches in Cyprus into a subsidiary: National Bank of Greece (Cyprus). The next year the Greek government dissolved the insolvent Arab Hellenic Bank at a cost to Greece's Deposit Guarantee Fund of €1.5 million in payments to depositors. In 1998 the Swiss architect Mario Botta won the competition for the new wing of the headquarters, the building was completed in 2001. In 1998 NBG merged with the Ethniki Ktimatiki Trapeza Ellados (National Mortgage Bank of Greece), itself the result of the merger of the National Mortgage Bank and the National Housing Bank of Greece. In 1999 NBG started trading on the New York Stock Exchange.

2000s and after
After the end of communism in Eastern Europe, NBG took advantage of the opportunity to expand to Southeast Europe. In April, 2000, in a joint deal with the European Bank for Reconstruction and Development (EBRD) and IFC, NBG acquired a majority stake in Stopanska Banka (Skopje, North Macedonia). In July, National Bank of Greece acquired 89.9% of the United Bulgarian Bank (UBB).

In 2002 NBG merged with ETEBA (National Investment Bank for Industrial Development), but NBG's attempted merger with Alpha Bank fell through. The next year, NBG bought Banca Romaneasca, a Romanian bank, and currently holds 88.7% of all outstanding shares.  Banca Romaneasca has 90 branches.

However, while it was expanding to Southeast Europe, NBG was retreating in North America and other places serving the Greek diaspora. The first move occurred in 2005 when NBG sold all its operations in Canada to Bank of Nova Scotia. The next year NBG sold its US arm, Atlantic Bank of New York, to New York Community Bancorp for US$400 million (€331 million) in cash. It then used proceeds from the sale to help finance further acquisitions in southeast Europe. In 2004 the Institute for Corporate Culture Affairs was founded by NBG and Deutsche Bank as not-for-profit institute based in Frankfurt.

In 2006 NBG acquired 46% of the shares of Finansbank in Turkey, a share that it increased in 2007 to 80%. Hüsnü Özyeğin reported in the initial press conference when NBG announced its 46% share purchase that he would have "loved to have been offered National Bank of Greece shares instead of cash, however there were no shares available" (outside of the current shares floated in the free market). Still in 2006, NBG acquired 99.44% of Serbia's Vojvođanska banka for €385 million.

At home, in 2005, as part of the NBG Group's ongoing effort to improve its portfolio structure and effectively respond to changes in the domestic and international markets, the Boards of Directors of National Bank of Greece S.A. and National Investment Company S.A. decided to merge the two companies through absorption of the latter by the Bank. Two years later, NBG merged with National Management & Organization Co. (the issuer of "Ethnokarta"). At the time, NBG already held 100% of National Management & Organization Co. shares. Also in 2007, NBG concluded the acquisition of P&K Investment Services SA. The acquisition created the largest provider of brokerage and investment services in Greece. NBG plans to expand this business to all countries where NBG has a presence.

The bank suffered following the Greek government debt crisis holding part of the debt. The bank wrote off more than $19 billion; €10 billion ($12.7 billion) of it in the restructuring of the debt.

On 18 February 2011 NBG made an offer to buy Alpha Bank for €2.8 billion. and another offer to buy Emporiki Bank, both offers were not successful, Emporiki Bank was then bought by Alpha Bank.

In January 2013 NBG made an offer to take over the Eurobank Ergasias this was not completed. The 64,000 Eurobank shareholders and the Greek capital market commission agreed. Some weeks after the proposed buyout that fell through, NBG presented the plans to reduce the staff of the new banking group, many of them by taking early retirement. The merger was criticized, as some said that the new bank would be too big if it had to be sold, but one of the bankers said that much bigger banks have been sold. The NBG absorbed the healthy assets and liabilities of the Greek FBBank in 2013.  The European Commission in July 2014 approved restructuring plans for NBG after finding that state aid was not hampering competition.

On 28 November 2015, the New York Stock Exchange announced that American depositary receipts (“ADRs”) of National Bank of Greece S.A. were in the process of being delisted following a 14% value decline on Friday 27 November 2015 and a year-to-date slump of 91%. While the year-to-date plunge of 91% was a major factor, the exchange stated that the National Bank of Greece is no longer suitable for listing based on “abnormally low” prices of the ADRs, pursuant to Section 802.01D of the NYSE Listed Company Manual. Also, the bank failed to meet the trading standards and also failed to cross the $1.00 mark since mid-July, resulting in the NYSE’s determination to delist the bank's ADRs.

On 4 December 2015, the European Commission approved state aid amounting to €2.71 billion.

In December 2015, the bank announced it would sell Turkish subsidiary Finansbank to the Qatari QNB Group, in order to pay down its expensive central bank debt. Including €910 million of subordinate debt, a sum of €2.75 billion in cash was agreed upon. In 2015 National Bank of Greece announced it would sell NBGI Private Equity. In September 2016, the transaction of selling it funds to Stage Capital was completed.

In March 2017, the bank entered into an agreement to sell its South Agrican subsidiary South African Bank of Athens to AFGRI Holdings. The sale was completed in October 2018. The bank was renamed GroBank.

National Bank of Greece has faced bad loans due to the debt crisis in the country and has opted for securitizations projects since 2020. In February 2020, NBG announced the project Frontier, which consisted of the securitization of non-performing loans. NBG’s Frontier portfolio is composed of more than 6.0 billion euros of non-performing mortgages, small and medium-sized business loans, as customer loans. In June 2020, NGB hired Morgan Stanley to advise on bad debt sales.

In March 2021, NGB announced the project Frontier 2 for reducing the non-performing credit exposure ratio from 13.6 percent to 6-7 percent. National Bank of Greece's impaired loans fell to 4.2 billion euros in the first quarter of 2021. In July 2021, NBG picked DoValue, Bain Capital and Fortress as preferred bidders on bad loans sale.

Branches

The bank has over 500 branches in Greece and some in Australia, Egypt and United Kingdom. It owns bank subsidiaries in Albania, Bulgaria, Cyprus, North Macedonia, Malta, Romania, Serbia and South Africa.

Former acquisitions
 Bank of Athens, Greece, 1952
 Stopanska Banka, North Macedonia, 2000
 United Bulgarian Bank, Bulgaria, 2000–2017
 Banca Romaneasca, Romania, 2002–2017
 Vojvođanska banka, Serbia, 2005–2017
 Finansbank, Turkey, 2006–2015

Patronage and sponsorship
The NBG conducts philanthropy through the National Bank of Greece Cultural Foundation and other endeavours like book printing and theatres.

The NBG organizes the i-bank Competition Innovation & Technology competition rewarding original ideas based in new technologies on i-banking and e-commerce (3rd competition in 2012).

During the crisis in Greece the situation of the health sector is very difficult, the NBG built a new wing of the Evangelismos Hospital in Athens. It cost 30 Mil. €.

See also

 National Bank of Greece Cultural Foundation
 List of Greek companies
 List of banks in Greece
 Banking in Greece
 Inter-Alpha Group of Banks

Notes

Further reading
 Michel S. Eulambio: The National Bank of Greece: A History of the Financial and Economic Evolution of Greece, 1924

External links

Company profile on reuters.com
Stock quote on Bloomberg
 
  National Bank of Greece (ADR): OTCMKTS:NBGGY quotes & news - Google Finance

Companies formerly listed on the New York Stock Exchange
Banks of Greece
1841 establishments in Greece
Banks established in 1841
Companies listed on the Athens Exchange
European investment banks
Greek brands
Banks under direct supervision of the European Central Bank